Hood may refer to:

Covering

Apparel
 Hood (headgear), type of head covering
 Article of academic dress
 Bondage hood, sex toy
 Hoodie, hooded sweatshirt

Anatomy
 Clitoral hood, a hood of skin surrounding the clitoris
 Hood, a flap of skin behind the head of a cobra

Other coverings
 Fume hood, piece of laboratory safety equipment
 Hood (car), covering over the engine compartment in a motor vehicle ('bonnet' in most Commonwealth countries)
 Kitchen hood, exhaust system for a stove or cooktop
 Lens hood, device used to block light from creating glare in photographs

Rail transport uses 
 Hood (rail transport), a rigid cover to protect a load on a flat wagon or a coil car
 Hood unit, a type of diesel or electric locomotive
 Long hood
 Short hood

Art, entertainment and media

Fictional entities
 The Hood, fictional Marvel Comics character
 Hood (Malazan), fictional god in the Malazan Book of the Fallen universe
 Hood (Thunderbirds), fictional character in the Thunderbirds TV series
 Hood (My Hero Academia), fictional Nomu character in the manga series My Hero Academia
 "The Hood", the vigilante name given to Oliver Queen in season 1 of the TV series Arrow

Films
 Hood, an unrealized film by The Wachowskis

Gaming
 Hood: Outlaws & Legends, a 2021 video game

Literature
 Hood (novel), a 1995 novel by Emma Donoghue
 Hood (2006), the first book of the King Raven Trilogy, by Stephen R. Lawhead

Music
 Hood (band), British band
 Hoods (band), American band

Enterprises and institutions
 Hood College, a liberal arts college in Frederick, Maryland, United States
 HP Hood, an American food manufacturer

People

 Robin Hood, medieval English folk hero

Places
 'hood, a slang term for neighborhood
 Black or African American Ghettos, often referred to as the hood

Iran
 Hood, Iran, a village in Fars Province of Iran

United States
 Fort Hood, a U.S. Army post near Killeen, Texas
 Hood, California, a census-designated place in the United States
 Hood Canal, a fjord off Puget Sound in the U.S. state of Washington
 Hood County, Texas, a county in the U.S. state of Texas
 Hood River (disambiguation)
 Hood, Virginia, an unincorporated community in the United States
 Mount Hood, the tallest mountain in the U.S. state of Oregon
 Mount Hood, Oregon, an unincorporated community named for the mountain
 Mount Hood Parkdale, Oregon, the name of the post office that serves Mount Hood, Oregon

Transportation
 List of ships called HMS Hood
 Hood Steamer, an early (1900–01) American manufacturer of steam cars in Lanark, Illinois, see List of defunct automobile manufacturers of the United States

Other uses
 HOOD method, software design method
 NASDAQ ticker symbol for Robinhood Markets
 Hood, codename for the largest secretly detonated thermonuclear device over United States territory; see Operation Plumbbob

See also

 
 
 Hoodwink (disambiguation)
 Hoodlum (disambiguation)
 Robin Hood (disambiguation)